Jacksen Ferreira Tiago (born 28 May 1968) commonly known as Jacksen F. Tiago or JFT, is a Brazilian retired footballer. After retiring from playing, he became a football manager.  One of the most influential in Indonesian football history, he has a tremendous records for both as a player and as a manager. As a long-time resident of Indonesia, he is fluent in Indonesian and Javanese.

Playing career

In his first season in Indonesia League, he played for Petrokimia Putra which ended up as league runners-up Indonesia's first. Tiago then moved to PSM Makassar before finding success with Persebaya Surabaya. He was the best player in the Liga Indonesia on the season 1996/1997 when he helped Persebaya to championship.

After two seasons in Persebaya, he then moved to Singapore to play for Geylang United, but only lasted one season before returning to Persebaya. In 2001, he moved to Petrokimia and at the end of the season retired as a player.

Tiago brought Persebaya, which relegated the previous season, promotion to the First Division in 2003 and winner of the season 2004.

Management career
In 2008, he signed managerial contract with Persipura Jayapura. During the his tenure at Persipura Jayapura, he won three Indonesia Super League titles in the 2008-09, 2010-11, and 2013 seasons.

In March 2013, the Football Association of Indonesia (PSSI) requested Jacksen to become assistant coach of the Indonesia national team in the face of Saudi Arabia at the 2015 AFC Asian Cup qualification round. After that in April he was officially appointed by the PSSI as head coach of the Indonesia national team.

In November 2014, he signed with Penang FA, and brought Penang FA promotion to the Malaysia Super League.

In 2017 seasons of Liga 1 Indonesia, he signed a long-term contract with PS Barito Putera.

Honours and awards

Player
Bonsucesso
 Rio State Championship Second Level: 1984
Confiança
 Campeonato Sergipano: 1990
Persebaya Surabaya
 Liga Indonesia Premier Division: 1996–97

Individual
 Liga Indonesia Premier Division top scorers: 1996–97

Manager
Persebaya Surabaya
 Liga Indonesia Premier Division: 2004
 Liga Indonesia First Division: 2003

Persipura Jayapura
 Indonesia Super League: 2008–09, 2010–11, 2013
 Indonesian Community Shield :2009
 Indonesian Inter Island Cup: 2011

Persis Solo
 Liga 2 : 2021–22

Individual
 Indonesia Super League Fair Play Award: 2008–09
 Indonesia Super League Coach of the Year: 2013
 Mario Jorge Lobo Zagallo Trophy: 2011

Controversies
On 15 April 2014, after press conference match between Persipura Jayapura vs Persebaya Surabaya, Jacksen got into a fight with Greg Nwokolo, because they have personal problems since his tenure as Indonesia national football team coach, the situation eased after the police restrained both of them.

References

1968 births
Living people
Brazilian footballers
Brazilian football managers
Brazilian expatriate footballers
Expatriate footballers in China
Expatriate footballers in Indonesia
Expatriate footballers in Singapore
Expatriate football managers in Indonesia
Expatriate football managers in Malaysia
Brazilian expatriate sportspeople in Indonesia
Brazilian expatriate sportspeople in Malaysia
Brazilian expatriate sportspeople in Singapore
Footballers from Rio de Janeiro (city)
Indonesia Super League managers
Persebaya Surabaya managers
Persipura Jayapura managers
Persita Tangerang managers
Persitara Jakarta Utara managers
Persiter Ternate managers
Mitra Kukar managers
Indonesia national football team managers
Geylang International FC players
Home United FC players
Singapore Premier League players
Association football forwards
Brazilian expatriate sportspeople in China